Graham Simpson is a British politician and former journalist who has been a Member of the Scottish Parliament (MSP) for the Central Scotland region since 2016. A member of the Scottish Conservatives, he served as Shadow Cabinet Secretary for Transport, Infrastructure and Connectivity from 2020 to 2021.

He was a councillor in South Lanarkshire Council between 2007 and 2017. Within Parliament, Simpson is the Conservative Party Shadow Cabinet Secretary for Housing, Communities and Social Security and sits on the Local Government and Communities Committee.  Simpson is also the Deputy Convenor of the cross party group on Cycling, Walking and Buses, Deputy Convenor of the cross party groups on Life Sciences and Architecture and the Built Environment as well as a member of the Beer & Pubs and Housing cross party groups.

Early career 
Simpson worked as a journalist for 26 years at News Corporation, rising to the position of deputy chief sub-editor of The Scottish Sun. He also worked briefly at the Daily Record.

Political career

Scottish Parliament 
For the 2016 Scottish Parliament election, Simpson was selected in to contest the East Kilbride constituency and was placed second on the Conservatives' Central region list, behind Margaret Mitchell MSP and ahead of Alison Harris MSP. Margaret Mitchell was re-elected and both Simpson and Harris were elected to the Scottish Parliament for the first time on the Central region list. The electoral region represented by Simpson covers East Kilbride, Motherwell and Wishaw and Airdrie and Shotts.

In the 2016–21 Scottish Parliament, Simpson is Scottish Conservative spokesperson for Housing and Communities, convener of the Delegated Powers and Law Reform Committee and a member of the Local Government and Communities Committee. He is also a member of the following Cross-Party Groups: Beer And Pubs, Cycling, Walking and Buses, Housing and Life Sciences.

In September 2017, Simpson was criticised after claiming there are "no-go areas" in some parts of Scotland's major cities. The SNP said his comments echoed those of Donald Trump, who was widely condemned after saying police were frightened to enter some parts of London and Paris.

References

External links 
 

Living people
Members of the Scottish Parliament 2016–2021
Conservative MSPs
Scottish Conservative Party councillors
Scottish journalists
Politicians from Aberdeen
Year of birth missing (living people)
Councillors in South Lanarkshire
Members of the Scottish Parliament 2021–2026